Henry A. L. Parkhurst (born January 1937) is a New Hampshire politician.

Early life
Parkhurst was born in January 1937 in Keene, New Hampshire.

Military career
Parkhurst served in the United States Coast Guard.

Political career
In 2002, Parkhurst was elected to the New Hampshire House of Representatives where he represents the Cheshire 13 district. Parkhurst assumed office in 2002. Parkhurst is a Democrat.

Personal life
Parkhurst resides in Winchester, New Hampshire.

References

Living people
1937 births
People from Keene, New Hampshire
People from Winchester, New Hampshire
Democratic Party members of the New Hampshire House of Representatives
21st-century American politicians